The Permanent Member of the Secretariat, officially the Permanent Member of the Communist Party of Vietnam Central Committee's Secretariat, is a senior position within the Communist Party of Vietnam. 

The Permanent Member is appointed by the Politburo, and is responsible for the management of directives and day-to-day work of the Secretariat. A member of both the Politburo and the Secretariat, the officeholder is often considered the fifth most powerful figure in Vietnam's political system — immediately behind the General Secretary of the Central Committee, the President, the Prime Minister and the Chair of the National Assembly.

The current officeholder is Trương Thị Mai, the first woman to serve in this position. She was appointed by a decision of the 13th Politburo on 6 March 2023 to replace Võ Văn Thưởng, who left office after his election as President of Vietnam on 2 March 2023.

History 
The office was established at the Party's 4th National Congress.

During the tenure of the 8th Central Committee (1996–2001), the Secretariat was replaced by the Politburo Standing Committee, thus, the office was known as Permanent Member of the Politburo Standing Committee.

The current qualifications for the officeholder is in accordance with Regulation No. 214-QD/TW dated 2 January 2020 of the Politburo on title standards and evaluation criteria for cadres under the management of the Central Committee, the Politburo and the Secretariat.

Selection process

Political qualifications
A Permanent Member of the Secretariat has to be a Central Committee member. To be elected to the Central Committee, one must show absolute loyalty to the Party’s interests, the nation and the people. Moreover, a Central Committee member must steadfastly commit to Marxism-Leninism, Ho Chi Minh Thought, national independence, socialism and the Party’s line. The Permanent Member must have an unwavering political stance and show political bravery. Therefore, the individual must resolutely protect the Party's ideology, the Party's Platform, the Party's line, the Constitution and the State's laws and combat erroneous views. Moreover, they must be patriotic, always put the interests of the Party, nation and the people above their personal interests, and be willing to sacrifice themself for the Party’s revolutionary cause, national independence and the people’s happiness.

As a Central Committee member, a Permanent Member must have exemplary ethics and live a good lifestyle. The 214-QD/TW regulations state that the Permanent Member has to have exemplary moral qualities such as living honestly, humbly, sincerely, purely, simply, tolerantly, and being thrift, having a high sense of integrity, fairness and impartiality. Furthermore, the regulation stresses that the officeholder must not have ambition for power, while stressing the need for enthusiasm and a high sense of responsibility for work. A Permanent Member cannot be corrupt, seek opportunities for personal profiteering and must resolutely combat, prevent and repel deterioration of political ideology, morality, lifestyle, manifestations of self-evolution, self-transformation, bureaucracy, corruption, negativity, waste, rights and group interests in the party-state. More specifically, the Permanent Member cannot let relatives and acquaintances take advantage of their positions and powers for profit. A Permanent Member must strictly implement the Party's organisational and disciplinary principles, especially the principles of democratic centralism and criticism and self-criticism. It is expected that the officeholder properly exercises their powers and responsibilities and direct the strict implementation of principles, regulations and procedures on cadre work as well as resolutely struggling against manifestations and deeds contrary to the regulations of the Party and the State in cadre work.

Work qualifications
Since every Permanent Member has also served concurrently in the Politburo, the party regulation 214-QD/TW of 2020 states explicitly that one must have served a full term in this body before the appointment. To guarantee a successful selection process and that the candidate possesses the appropriate qualifications, it is essential for the Permanent Member to possess the following traits and abilities: a high standing, a core of unity in the Central Committee, the Politburo, the Secretariat, and throughout the Party. Possess a strong degree of political acumen, broad knowledge and expertise in party building and political system construction. The Permanent Member is also expected to be well-informed about politics, economics, culture, society, defence, security and international relations. Understanding of politics, decision-making abilities in management, and the capability to coordinate the staff and agencies of the Party Central Committee, Fatherland Front, and socio-political organisations efficiently and harmoniously are all critical qualifications. Finally, the Permanent Member is expected to have former experience as a secretary of provincial and city committees or as a leader of central commissions, ministries, and branches.

According to party regulation 214-QD/TW, a Permanent Member should possess the following qualities: objectiveness, comprehensiveness, dialectical perspective, an understanding of history, innovative thinking, and strategic vision. Science-based working methods, political acumen, and the capability to lead, direct, and organise the effective implementation of Party policies and guidelines, as well as the laws of the State, are crucial for the officeholder. In addition, she or he must be capable of summarising practice, theoretical research, analysis, and forecasting. A Permanent Member must have an in-depth knowledge of the general situation, the fields, localities, agencies and units assigned to manage and take charge of them. As well as identifying contradictions, challenges, new problems, complex problems, limitations, and weaknesses in practice, the officeholder must also proactively propose feasible and effective tasks and solutions. An ideal candidate should be dynamic, creative, hardworking, industrious, daring to think, act, assume responsibility, do things decisively, and be open to experiencing difficulties. As a result, the permanent member must base his work on the premise that sayings go hand-in-hand with actions. A candidate must have outstanding achievements, have specific results and have made an essential contribution to promoting the development of industries, localities, agencies and units. Moreover, the candidate must be willing to work on issues that are important to the people and be willing to serve the people wholeheartedly. Last, as a Permanent Member, one must be able to form the nucleus that gathers and promotes the synergy of the political system and, as such, must be highly trusted by fellow Party members and the masses.

In addition to these, regulation 214-QD/TW states that the candidate must have obtained a university degree or undergone a course at the party school, the Hồ Chí Minh National Academy of Politics and Public Administration. Experience in state management as a senior specialist or equivalent is also a positive, as well as speaking a foreign language and having basic computer skills. A candidate should also be healthy enough to perform his duties. The candidate must fit the age requirements set by Party's regulations. Furthermore, a candidate should have experience as a successful leader and key manager of direct subordinates before being appointed.

Duties and responsibilities
In accordance with Clause 5 of Article 7 of Regulation 80-QD/TW dated 18 August 2022, the Permanent Member is responsible for assuming the prime responsibility for, alongside the Head of the Central Organisation Commission and the Chairman of the Central Inspection Commission, reviewing the election results and deciding on the approval of the newly-elected executive committees, standing committees, secretaries and deputy secretaries. In addition, it must review the election results for inspection commissions and those of provincial committees, city committees and party committees directly under the Central Committee. The Permanent Member can, as long as they are not in breach of the Party's Charter, appoint additional members of standing committees directly under the Central Committee. In addition, the Permanent Member can appoint members of party delegations. Furthermore, the Permanent Member can give opinions on the personnel of members of the Politburo and the Secretariat, the Vice President of Vietnam, deputy prime ministers and the vice chairs of the National Assembly. In accordance with Politburo and/or Secretariat decisions, the Permanent Member may re-appoint cadres under the Secretariat to manage the work of party committees, agencies, units, and social organisations directly under its jurisdiction. In the event that they are not eligible for reappointment, they must inform the relevant authorities.

Officeholders

Notes

See also 

 General Secretary of the Communist Party of Vietnam
 Secretariat of the Communist Party of Vietnam
 Central Committee of the Communist Party of Vietnam

References 

Central Committee of the Communist Party of Vietnam
Lists of political office-holders in Vietnam
Secretariat of the Communist Party of Vietnam